Susan Schlapbach is a former Swiss female curler.

Teams

References

External links
 

Living people

Swiss female curlers
European curling champions
Swiss curling champions
Year of birth missing (living people)